Dreams and Daggers is an album by American jazz singer Cécile McLorin Salvant that includes songs recorded both during live performance and in the studio. The album was released as a set of two CDs or three LPs on Mack Avenue Records on September 29, 2017.

Reception
AllMusic reviewer Matt Collar described the album as "a thoughtfully curated selection of standards and several originals, all touching upon the themes of romance and heartbreak", and awarded it five stars.

Stereophile reviewer Fred Kaplan declared the album to be "the best jazz vocal album in a decade, maybe in longer than that."

The album earned Salvant her third Grammy nomination and her second Grammy Award for Best Jazz Vocal Album. The album was also nominated for the 2018 NAACP Image Award for Outstanding Jazz Album.

Track listing
Source:

Tracks marked with asterisk (*) recorded in studio at the DiMenna Center for Classical Music. All other tracks recorded live at the Village Vanguard.

Personnel
Source:

 Cécile McLorin Salvant – vocals
 Aaron Diehl – piano on all tracks except "Red Instead", "You've Got to Give Me Some" and "Fascination"
 Sullivan Fortner – piano on "You've Got to Give Me Some"
 Paul Sikivie – double bass on all tracks except "Red Instead", "You've Got to Give Me Some" and "Fascination"; string arrangement on "And Yet", "More", "Red Instead", "You're My Thrill", "The Worm" and "Fascination"
 Lawrence Leathers – drums on all tracks except "Red Instead", "You've Got to Give Me Some" and "Fascination"
 Catalyst Quartet – strings on "And Yet", "More", "Red Instead", "You're My Thrill", "The Worm" and "Fascination"
 Karla Donehew-Perez – violin
 Suliman Tekalli – violin
 Paul Laraia – viola
 Karlos Rodriguez – cello

Production
 Al Pryor – production
 Cecile McLorin Salvant – production; booklet art direction, handwriting and illustrations
 Gretchen Valade – executive production
 Will Wakefield – production management
 Damon Whittemore – record engineering
 Todd Whitelock – record engineering, mix engineering
 Josh Welshman – engineering assistance
 Isaiah Abolin – engineering assistance
 Akihiro Nishimura – engineering assistance
 Doug Iszlai – engineering assistance
 Allen Rubinstein – front-of-house engineering for the Village Vanguard
 Richie Clarke – front-of-house engineering consultancy for Mack Avenue Records
 Mark Wilder – master engineering
 Kevin Gray – LP cut engineering
 Raj Naik – booklet layout and design
 Mark Fitton – booklet photography
 Maria Ehrenreich – creative services and production
 Sharon Green – product management

Charts

References

2017 albums
French-language albums
Cécile McLorin Salvant albums
Grammy Award for Best Jazz Vocal Album
Albums recorded at the Village Vanguard